Angie & Debbie was an contemporary gospel music gospel duo composed of siblings Angelique Winans-Caldwell and Debra Renee Winans-Lowe, members of the well-known Winans family. Scoring minor success in the 1990s, the pair released two albums, including Bold which created controversy due to the inclusion of the song Not Natural and Angie & Debbie's conservative views on homosexuality.

In 1994, the duo received a Soul Train Award nomination for Best New Artist.

Discography
 Angie & Debbie (1993)
 Bold (1997)

References

American contemporary R&B musical groups
American gospel musical groups
Contemporary R&B duos
Winans family
American musical duos
Female musical duos
Sibling musical duos